Nethravathi is a 2021 Indian Kannada language soap opera which premiered on 15 March 2021 airing on Udaya TV and it is available for worldwide streaming on Sun NXT. The serial stars Durgashree and Sunny Mahipal in lead roles. The serial marks the return of actress Anjali after hiatus of two decades.

Cast
Durgashree as Nethravathi 
Sunny Mahipal
Anjali as Bhagirathi, Nethravathi's mother 
Chaitra Rao

References

2021 Indian television series debuts
Kannada-language television shows
Udaya TV original programming